Esteban Yaffar (born 28 October 1993) is a Bolivian male BMX rider, representing his nation at international competitions. He competed in the time trial event at the 2015 UCI BMX World Championships.

References

External links
 
 

1993 births
Living people
BMX riders
Bolivian male cyclists
Pan American Games competitors for Bolivia
Cyclists at the 2015 Pan American Games
Place of birth missing (living people)